The Central Coast is an area of California, roughly spanning the coastal region between Point Mugu and Monterey Bay. It lies northwest of Los Angeles and south of the San Francisco Bay Area, and includes the rugged, undeveloped stretch of coastline known as Big Sur. From south to north, there are six counties that make up the Central Coast: Ventura, Santa Barbara, San Luis Obispo, Monterey, San Benito, and Santa Cruz.

The Central Coast is the location of the Central Coast American Viticultural Area.

Geographically, the actual midpoint of the California coast lies north of Santa Cruz, near Año Nuevo State Park in San Mateo County. Neither the popular use of the term Central Coast nor that of the California North Coast include the San Francisco Peninsula counties of San Mateo and San Francisco.

History

The Central Coast area was originally inhabited by Chumash and other Native American people since at least 10,000 BC. Many of these communities were coastal, where the people utilized marine resources and dwelt near freshwater inflows to the Pacific Ocean. For example, there were significant communities near the mouth of Morro Creek and Los Osos Creek.

Juan Rodríguez Cabrillo visited the Central Coast, landing in Santa Barbara County in 1542, having sailed from the south.

Overview

The region is known primarily for agriculture and tourism. Major crops include wine grapes, lettuce, strawberries, and artichokes. The Salinas Valley is one of the most fertile farming regions in the United States.  Tourist attractions include Cannery Row in Monterey, the Monterey Bay Aquarium, the theatres, galleries and white sand beaches of Carmel-by-the-Sea, the golf courses of Pebble Beach and the Monterey Peninsula, the rugged coastline of Big Sur and Hearst Castle in San Simeon. Further south is Morro Rock and the port city of Morro Bay, which is adjacent to college town San Luis Obispo. The Santa Ynez Valley is home to the Central Coast Film Society, which celebrates filmmakers, cinema and media arts that are from the region, also known as "Hollywood's Backyard."

The area is not densely populated.  The largest city in the region is Oxnard in Ventura County, with a population estimated at 203,007 in 2013. University of California campuses are found in Santa Barbara and Santa Cruz, near the south and north edges of the region respectively.  California State University, Monterey Bay, founded in 1994, uses facilities donated when Fort Ord was converted from military to civilian uses. California Polytechnic State University, in San Luis Obispo, was founded in 1901. California State University Channel Islands opened in Camarillo in 2002, as the 23rd campus in the California State University system.

Population
The six counties that make up the Central Coast region had an estimated population of 2,348,601 according to the 2020 census.

Counties by population

|}

Major cities 
The following cities had a population over 20,000 as of the 2020 census:

 Oxnard - 202,063
 Salinas - 163,542
 Thousand Oaks - 126,966
 Simi Valley - 126,356
 Ventura - 110,763
 Santa Maria - 109,707
 Santa Barbara - 88,665
 Camarillo - 70,741
 Santa Cruz - 62,956
 Watsonville - 52,590
 San Luis Obispo - 47,063
 Lompoc - 44,444
 Hollister - 41,678
 Moorpark - 36,284
 Goleta - 32,690
 Seaside - 32,366
 Paso Robles - 31,490
 Santa Paula - 30,657
 Monterey - 30,218
 Atascadero - 29,773
 Soledad - 24,925
 Marina - 22,359
 Port Hueneme - 21,954

Transportation
Travel is almost entirely by private automobile. Because of its position roughly halfway between the major cities of Los Angeles and San Francisco, San Luis Obispo is home to America's first motel. The major highway is U.S. Route 101, which runs north-south from Los Angeles, through most of the major communities of the Central Coast, to San Francisco. State Route 1, a smaller but much more scenic route, connects the coastal communities, running through San Simeon, Morro Bay, and Big Sur. Amtrak maintains train service with the Coast Starlight and Pacific Surfliner routes along the Union Pacific Railroad Coast Line that also transports freight. There are no major airports, although Monterey, Santa Barbara, Santa Maria and San Luis Obispo have regional airports with commuter service. Greyhound buses serve most of the region.

Monterey-Salinas Transit (MST) operates bus services throughout Monterey County as far south as Big Sur on the coast and King City in the Salinas Valley. MST also offers connection service to San Jose Diridon Station, downtown Santa Cruz, and Paso Robles and Templeton in Northern San Luis Obispo County via regional routes. Santa Cruz Metro offers services within Santa Cruz County, including connections to San Jose and San Jose State and connection to MST service in Watsonville, heading south to Salinas.

See also
Big Sur
California State Route 1
Coastal California
Carmel-by-the-Sea
Hearst Castle
List of tourist attractions in Monterey County, California
Mission County (proposed)
Monterey Peninsula
Monterey Bay National Marine Sanctuary (MBNMS)
 Davidson Seamount, one of the largest known seamounts in the world, added to MBNMS in 2009
Salinas Valley
Santa Cruz Mountains
Wine Regions

References

External links 

Central California Coast Guide with Photos A comprehensive guide to California's Central Coast

Regions of California
West Coast of the United States
Geography of California
Northern California
Southern California
Tourism regions of California